Germany is the host nation of the 2022 European Championships in Munich. It competed with 336 athletes across all 9 sports in the Championships. The team finished with 60 medals, amongst them 26 gold medals, which ranked them 1st at the conclusion of the Championships.

Medallists

| width="78%" align="left" valign="top" |

| width="22%" align="left" valign="top" |

Competitors
The following is the list of number of competitors in the Championships:

Athletics

Beach volleyball

Germany has qualified 4 male and 5 female pairs.

Men

Women

Canoeing

Men

Women

Cycling

Road

Men

Women

Track

Elimination race

Keirin

Madison

Omnium

Points race

Pursuit

Scratch

Sprint

Team sprint

Time trial

Mountain bike

BMX freestyle

Gymnastics

Germany has entered 5 men and 5 women.

Men

Qualification

Individual finals

Women

Qualification

Individual finals

Rowing

Men

Women

Mixed

Sport climbing

Boulder

Combined

Lead

Speed

Table tennis

Germany entered 5 men and 7 women.

Men

Women

Mixed

Triathlon

Men

Women

Mixed

References

2022
Nations at the 2022 European Championships
European Championships